In mathematics, the Struve functions , are solutions  of the non-homogeneous Bessel's differential equation:

 

The complex number α is  the order of the Struve function, and is often an integer.

 

Definitions
Since this is a non-homogeneous equation, solutions can be constructed from a single particular solution by adding the solutions of the homogeneous problem. In this case, the homogeneous solutions are the Bessel functions, and the particular solution may be chosen as the corresponding Struve function.

Power series expansion
Struve functions, denoted as  have the power series form

where  is the gamma function.

The modified Struve functions, denoted , have the following power series form

Integral form
Another definition of the Struve function, for values of  satisfying , is possible expressing in term of the Poisson's integral representation:

Asymptotic forms
For small , the power series expansion is given above.

For large , one obtains:

where  is the Neumann function.

Properties
The Struve functions satisfy the following recurrence relations:

Relation to other functions
Struve functions of integer order can be expressed in terms of Weber functions  and vice versa: if  is a non-negative integer then

Struve functions of  order  where  is an integer can be expressed in terms of elementary functions. In particular if  is a non-negative integer then

where the right hand side is a spherical Bessel function.

Struve functions (of any order) can be expressed in terms of the generalized hypergeometric function :

Applications

The Struve and Weber functions were shown to have an application to beamforming in., and in describing the effect of confining interface on Brownian motion of colloidal particles at low Reynolds numbers.

References

External links
Struve functions at the Wolfram functions site.

Special functions
Struve family